Mass Spectrometry Reviews (usually abbreviated as Mass Spectrom. Rev.), is a peer-reviewed scientific journal, published since 1982 by John Wiley & Sons.  It publishes reviews in selected topics of mass spectrometry and associated scientific disciplines bimonthly.

See also
Journal of Mass Spectrometry
Rapid Communications in Mass Spectrometry
John Wiley & Sons

Mass spectrometry journals
Publications established in 1987